Ballyboley Junction railway station was the junction for the branch line to Doagh via Ballyclare (B&L) in Northern Ireland.

History

The station was opened as Ballyclare Junction by the Ballymena and Larne Railway on 24 August 1878. It was taken over by the Belfast and Northern Counties Railway in July 1889. This was in turn taken over by the Northern Counties Committee in 1906.

It was renamed Ballyboley Junction on 1 January 1890.

The station closed to passengers on 1 October 1930.

References 

 
 
 

Disused railway stations in County Antrim
Railway stations opened in 1887
Railway stations closed in 1933
Railway stations in Northern Ireland opened in the 19th century